This glossary of computer hardware terms is a list of definitions of terms and concepts related to computer hardware, i.e. the physical and structural components of computers, architectural issues, and peripheral devices.

A

B

C

D

E

F

G

H

I

J

K

L

M

N

O

P

R

S

T

U

V

W

Z

See also
List of computer term etymologies
Glossary of backup terms
Glossary of computer graphics
Glossary of computer science
Glossary of computer software terms

Glossary of energy efficient hardware/software
Glossary of Internet-related terms
Glossary of reconfigurable computing

References

External links
Dictionary: JESD88  JEDEC

Computer hardware terms
Wikipedia glossaries using description lists